The 1984 ACC men's basketball tournament was held in Greensboro, North Carolina, at the Greensboro Coliseum from March 9–11. Maryland defeated Duke, 74–62, to win the championship. Len Bias of Maryland was named the tournament MVP.

Bracket

References

Tournament
ACC men's basketball tournament
College sports tournaments in North Carolina
Basketball competitions in Greensboro, North Carolina
ACC men's basketball tournament
ACC men's basketball tournament